Darkey, Darkie or Darky may refer to:

 Darkey, disparaging term for a black person
Darkey Kelly (d. 1761), Irish woman burned at the stake
 Joe Darkey (born 1942), former Ghanaian professional boxer who competed in the 1960s
David Bedell-Sivright (1880–1915), Scottish international rugby union player nickname Darkie
Darlie, formerly Darkie, a brand of toothpaste